Helicol S.A. (Spanish acronym: Helicopteros Nacionales de Colombia) is a helicopter operator based at El Dorado International Airport in Bogotá, Colombia. It is a subsidiary airline of Avianca.

History
Helicol was founded on July 3, 1955, as a response to the needs of the oil exploration activities in Colombia. Initially it was a joint venture between Philadelphia, Pennsylvania based Keystone Helicopters Corporation, and Avianca; as Keystone had signed a contract with Shell Oil Company to run oil exploration activities in the north side of the Country. In order to fulfill the air laws in force back then, Keystone searched for a Colombian partner who could take control of 51% of the stakes of the company, a role taken by Avianca. It was the creation of the first non-regular air services supplier in Colombia.

Three Bell 47G helicopters leased from Keystone became the initial fleet of Helicol, and Mr. Alberto Farías Mendoza, and important Avianca's executive was appointed as the first general manager. Similar contracts were signed shortly afterwards and by 1957, the fleet grow up to 6 helicopters. Between 1961 and 1963, crop-dusting activities in helicopters were also performed, and in 1964, Helicol was hired by the Texas Petroleum and Gulf Oil Company to build the trans-Andean pipeline between the town of Orito in Putumayo Department and Tumaco, on the Pacific Ocean in Colombia, a job in which the Bell 204s were used. The tasks required to lift heavy metallic tubes and locate them in the trace of the pipeline, through irregular terrains. Similar works were performed in Ecuador in 1969, in the construction of the Trans-Ecuadorean pipeline and similar activities were performed in Peru in 1970. It is important to mention that even former Vietnam pilots did not succeed in flying the Bell 204 machines, the way Colombians did. Additional services were also conducted in El Salvador, Guatemala and Nicaragua, in Central America. By this time, the company was fully owned by Avianca.

Helicol served well other activities in Colombia such as mining, power lines and hydroelectric dams construction; In 1980, Helicol was the largest helicopter operator in Latin America. In 1978, business jet service was introduced with the use of IAI 1124 Westwinds, becoming the first type of such to operate in Colombia. At that time, the company had established a maintenance center in Barranquilla where piston engines repair/overhaul was carried out, as well as maintenance support to Bell helicopters, dully authorized by the manufacturer for the air Forces of Argentina and Panama.

In 1979, 4 de Havilland Canada DHC-6 Twin Otters were put in service, mainly for the coal mining activities conducted at La Guajira, as well as to the oil industry. Helicol also supplied the ground and flight crews for the operation of 2 de Havilland Canada Dash 7, owned by Drummond Company, winner of the rights to exploit the biggest open sky coal mines in the world. Other operations conducted by Helicol on behalf of third parties included the Health Services of the Antioquia Department Bell 206, as well as the Caracol news helicopter. In 1981, Helicol leased 2 Grumman Gulfstream I aircraft from North American Air Service, which were later purchased to cover contracts signed with the Colombian Central Bank for transport needs. 2 additional G-1s were also leased to complement the first two of the type.

Besides, the 47G model, other Bell Helicopters were also flown by Helicol until around 1984. Between August 1982 and May 1985, an Arava 201 aircraft was leased from IAI to provide support to the different oil and mining activities performed by U.S., Canadian and British companies in the Country. A Bell 214ST helicopter was also introduced in the mid-80s.

The advent of at least 12 Russian-built Mil Mi-8 and Mil Mi-17, and French Aerospatiale (current Eurocopter) AS350B and AS355F1, allowed Helicol to expand its activities and by 1994, it offered a helicopter link service between the downtown Medellin and the airport, located in the top of an 8.000-ft. mountain, until one of the Bell 212s used was hijacked.

By 1996, the main shareholder, Avianca, decided that it was required to reorganize the company, and the MI-8 and AS350B were all sold. The Twin Otters were transferred to the sister company SAM, and since the Westwind fleet was already sold a few years earlier, a Cessna Citation III activities of Helicol.

After the purchase of Avianca in 2004 by the Synergy Group, Helicol's acquisition followed in 2007. By 2008, the Beechcraft 1900D were also added to its downsized fleet, these last to be operated by the recently founded sister company Petroleum Aviation Services.

Operations
95% of Helicol operations are onshore.
Support facilities and supervision of electrical networks
Air Ambulance and Search and Rescue.
Off-Shore Operations
Fire Fighting
(Bambi bucket) Support for rescue operations
Seismographic study with long and short line.
Executive Transportation
Cargo Transport
Pipeline Construction and Maintenance
Oil Exploration and Drilling

Destinations

Fleet

Current fleet 
Helicol operates a fleet of both helicopters and fixed-wing aircraft.
AgustaWestland AW139
Beechcraft 1900D
Bell 212 
Bell 412
Bell 412EP

Former fleet
AgustaWestland AW119 Koala
Beechcraft King Air
Bell 205
Bell 206B
Bell H-13 Sioux
Cessna Citation III
Cessna Citation Bravo
de Havilland Canada DHC-6 Twin Otter
de Havilland Canada DHC-7
Grumman Gulfstream I
IAI 1124 Westwind
Mil Mi-8
Mil Mi-17

See also
Helicopteros Nacionales de Colombia, S.A. v. Hall, a United States Supreme Court decision in which Helicol was a party.

References

External links
 Helicol official website

Airlines of Colombia
Airlines established in 1955
Helicopter airlines
Avianca
1955 establishments in Colombia